Hurand (also Romanized as Hūrānd and Howrānd; also known as Horand) is a city in the Central District of Hurand County, East Azerbaijan province, Iran, and serves as capital of the county. At the 2006 census, its population was 3,876 in 907 households, when it was a city in the former Hurand District of Ahar County. The following census in 2011 counted 4,445 people in 1,127 households. The latest census in 2016 showed a population of 4,658 people in 1,352 households. Hurand District was separated from Ahar County to establish Hurand County.

References 

Cities in East Azerbaijan Province

Populated places in East Azerbaijan Province

<!-- Populated places in Hurand County-- >